Chemokine (C-C motif) ligand 13 (CCL13) is a small cytokine belonging to the CC chemokine family.  Its gene is located on human chromosome 17 within a large cluster of other CC chemokines.  CCL13 induces chemotaxis in monocytes, eosinophils, T lymphocytes, and basophils by binding cell surface G-protein linked chemokine receptors such as CCR2, CCR3 and CCR5.  Activity of this chemokine has been implicated in allergic reactions such as asthma.  CCL13 can be induced by the inflammatory cytokines interleukin-1 and TNF-α.

References

Cytokines